Hajjiabad-e Payabi (also Romanized as Ḩājjīābād-e Pāyābī and Ḩājīābād-e Pāyābī) is a village in Qaleh Ganj Rural District, in the Central District of Qaleh Ganj County, Kerman Province, Iran. At the 2006 census, its population was 33, in 5 families.

References 

Populated places in Qaleh Ganj County